American hip hop duo Rae Sremmurd has released three studio albums, three mixtapes, twenty-two singles, ten as a featured artist, and 29 music videos. Rae Sremmurd signed to EarDrummers Entertainment in 2013 and released their debut studio album, SremmLife, on January 6, 2015. The album charted at number five on the US Billboard 200. It features the triple platinum single "No Type" and also includes the platinum singles "No Flex Zone", "Throw Sum Mo", "This Could Be Us" and "Come Get Her". Rae Sremmurd collaborated with American rapper Ty Dolla Sign and Future on platinum single "Blasé", which peaked at number 66 in the US. In 2016, they released their second studio album, SremmLife 2. The album peaked at number four in the US. It features the number-one single "Black Beatles", which peaked in the top ten of many charts worldwide. SremmLife 2 also includes the platinum hits "Look Alive" and "Swang".

Albums

Studio albums

Mixtapes

Singles

As lead artist

As featured artist

Promotional singles

Other charted songs

Guest appearances

Music videos
On March 16, 2017, Rae Sremmurd received the YouTube Silver and Gold Play Buttons for surpassing 100,000 and one million subscribers respectively on their Vevo account on YouTube.

Notes

References

Discographies of American artists
Hip hop discographies